Vaizey is a surname. Notable people with the surname include:

 Ed Vaizey (born 1968), English politician and journalist
 Mrs George de Horne Vaizey (1857–1917), English writer
 John Vaizey, Baron Vaizey (1929–1984), British writer and economist
 Marina Vaizey (born 1938), British journalist and art critic